Harold Craig Melchert (born April 5, 1945) is an American linguist known particularly for his work on the Anatolian branch of Indo-European.

Biography
He received his B.A. in German from Michigan State University in 1967 and his Ph.D. in Linguistics from Harvard University in 1977. From 1968 to 1972 he served in the United States Air Force, where he learned Chinese and worked as a Chinese radio listener. In 1978 he accepted a position at the University of North Carolina at Chapel Hill, where he became Paul Debreczeny Distinguished Professor of Linguistics. In 2005 he was the Collitz Professor at the Linguistic Society of America Summer Institute. As of July 1, 2007 he is A. Richard Diebold Professor of Indo-European Studies at the University of California, Los Angeles.

Selected works
Studies in Hittite Historical Phonology. Göttingen: Vandenhoeck & Ruprecht, 1984, 
Lycian Lexicon. Chapel Hill, N.C.: Copytron, 1989, iv + 122pp.; 2nd edn. Chapel Hill University Press, 1993, vi + 130pp.
Cuneiform Luvian Lexicon. Chapel Hill, N.C.: self-published, 1993, 
Anatolian Historical Phonology, Amsterdam: Rodopi, 1994, 
A Grammar of the Hittite Language, Eisenbrauns, 2008, 
A Dictionary of the Lycian Language, Ann Arbor–NY: Beech Stave Press, 2004,

Further reading
Craig Melchert's home page

References

  

Hittitologists
Linguists from the United States
Defense Language Institute alumni
Historical linguists
Michigan State University alumni
Harvard University alumni
University of North Carolina at Chapel Hill faculty
University of California, Los Angeles faculty
Living people
Indo-Europeanists
Linguists of Indo-European languages
1945 births
Linguists of Anatolian languages